Jane Dentinger (born September 9, 1951) is an American mystery writer and former actress.

A graduate of Ithaca College with a degree in acting and directing, Dentinger moved to New York City, finding work as an actress both on Broadway and in regional theater. For a time she worked at the Murder Ink bookstore. Beginning in 2006 she was the editor in chief of the Mystery Guild. She is best known for the series of mysteries she wrote featuring Jocelyn "Josh" O'Roarke, an actress in New York City.

Works

Novels
Murder on Cue (1983)
First Hit of the Season (1984)
Death Mask (1988)
Dead Pan (1992)
The Queen is Dead (1994)
Who Dropped Peter Pan? (1995)

Collections
Murder, They Wrote (1997) (with Mary Daheim, Marjorie Eccles, Sally Gunning, Jean Hager, Ellen Hart, Kate Kingsbury, Janet Laurence, Marlys Millhiser, and Nancy Pickard)

Sources:

References

1951 births
Living people
American mystery writers
Women mystery writers
American women novelists
20th-century American novelists
20th-century American women writers
20th-century American actresses
American stage actresses
Ithaca College alumni
21st-century American women